"Paper Thin" is a song by American DJ and producer Illenium with American musician Tom DeLonge and his band Angels & Airwaves. It was released on October 23, 2020, as Illenium's second song on 12 Tone Music and Warner Records. It is the second single off his fourth studio album Fallen Embers.

Background
Illenium said: "I got to collaborate with one of my favourite artists ever, Tom DeLonge. I feel like it has the nostalgic pop-punk vibes but also really incorporates my sound. I think the blend sounds amazing and I'm so stoked with how this one turned out!"

Music video
Illenium told about the video: “In a post-apocalyptic world that is being threatened by an unknown enemy, the “Paper Thin” video exists as a parallel storyline to the “Nightlight” video. Our protagonists find comfort in each other and find meaning in the beautiful things not yet destroyed as they attempt to survive in this new universe.”

The video premiered on December 10, 2020.

Charts

References

2020 singles
2020 songs
Illenium songs
Angels & Airwaves songs
Songs written by Illenium
Songs written by Tom DeLonge